Second lieutenant is a junior commissioned officer military rank in many armed forces.

Australia
The rank of second lieutenant existed in the military forces of the Australian colonies and Australian Army until 1986.

In the colonial forces, which closely followed the practices of the British military, the rank of second lieutenant began to replace ranks such as ensign and cornet from 1871.

New appointments to the rank of second lieutenant ceased in the regular army in 1986. Immediately prior to this change, the rank had been effectively reserved for new graduates from the Officer Cadet School, Portsea which closed in 1985. (Graduates of the Australian Defence Force Academy (ADFA) and the Royal Military College, Duntroon (RMC-D) are commissioned as lieutenants.). The rank of second lieutenant is only appointed to officers in special appointments such as training institutions, university regiments and while under probation during training. Trainees undertaking Special Service Officer (SSO) training are also appointed at higher rank (as second lieutenants) than General Service Officer (GSO) trainees who start off at the rank of officer cadet (ADFA/Australian Army Reserve officer trainees) or staff cadet (Royal Military College, Duntroon).

Ranks equivalent to second lieutenant are acting sub-lieutenant in the Royal Australian Navy and pilot officer in the Royal Australian Air Force.

Canada
The Canadian Forces adopted the rank with insignia of a single gold ring around the service dress uniform cuff for both army and air personnel upon unification in 1968 until the late 2000s. For a time, naval personnel used this rank but reverted to the Royal Canadian Navy rank of acting sub-lieutenant, though the CF green uniform was retained until the mid-1980s. Currently, the Canadian Army insignia for second lieutenant is a pip and the Royal Canadian Air Force insignia for lieutenant is one thick braid. The equivalent rank for the Royal Canadian Navy is acting sub-lieutenant. Also known as an Ensign in the Foot Guards units (Canadian Grenadier Guards & Governor General's Foot Guards).

France
A second-lieutenant is equivalent to a junior commissioned officer (the French army does not use the terms commissioned or non-commissioned). During classes at officer training schools such as Saint Cyr the cadets rise quickly through the non-commissioned ranks of private, corporal, sergeant and reach the rank of aspirant which is the first officer rank. After additional training at specialised schools they get the bar of second-lieutenant. The insignia consists of a metal-colored bar in accordance with the color of the ceremonial uniform buttons and hat symbol.

For example, for the infantry, gold being the metal of the ceremonial dress buttons, the symbol on the béret being a golden grenade with two crossed rifles, and the symbol on the képi being a single golden grenade, therefore the insignia of a sous-lieutenant is a gold-colored bar.

For cavalry or forest rangers (light infantry mobilised from the Water and Forests Corp), ceremonial dress buttons were silver, as was the hunting horn on the forest commissioned officer's képi, therefore the insignia of a sous-lieutenant is a silver-colored bar.

Indonesia

In Indonesia, "second lieutenant" is known as letnan dua (letda) which is the most junior ranked officer in the Indonesian Military. Officers in the Indonesian National Armed Forces are commissioned through one of four major commissioning programs. Upon graduation the candidates are promoted to the rank of second lieutenant, thus becoming commissioned officers. The four programs are:
 National Armed Forces Academy (Akademi TNI): a four-year undergraduate program that emphasizes instruction in the arts, sciences, and professions, preparing men and women to take on the challenge of being officers in the armed forces (Army: Military Academy, Navy: Naval Academy, Air Force: Air Force Academy);
 Officer Candidate School: a 28-week program that is attended by senior NCOs or warrant officers from all services;
 Career Officer Program for college graduates: a 7–8 month program that is designed to recruit civilian professionals (e.g., doctors, dentists, pharmacists, psychologists) into the armed forces;
 Pilot Short Service School: a 34-month program to train pilots to serve in the armed forces.

New Zealand
Like many other Commonwealth countries, the rank structures of the New Zealand Defence Force usually follow British traditions. Hence the New Zealand Army maintains a rank of second lieutenant and the Royal New Zealand Air Force has its exact equivalent, pilot officer.

However, the Royal New Zealand Navy breaks with British tradition and uses the name ensign for its most junior commissioned officer rank (rather than the usual equivalents, such as acting sub-lieutenant or second lieutenant).

Pakistan
The Pakistan Army follows the British pattern of ranks. A second lieutenant is represented by one metal pip on each shoulder in case of "khaki uniform" and one diamond star on the chest in case of camouflage combat dress. However a second lieutenant in the Pakistan Army is usually promoted to lieutenant 6 months after commissioning. Test for 2nd lieutenant is held every year twice in Pakistan. It is the smallest rank among commissioned officers.

Philippines
In the Armed Forces of the Philippines, the rank of second lieutenant is the lowest commissioned officer rank used by the Philippine Army, Philippine Air Force and the Philippine Marine Corps. It stands below the rank of First Lieutenant.

Singapore 
In Singapore, the rank of second lieutenant (2LT) is awarded to officer cadets who have graduated from the completion of their officer cadet course, and is the lowest commissioned rank in the Singapore Armed Forces, below the rank of lieutenant and above the rank of chief warrant officer. The rank insignia of a second lieutenant is a bar.

United Kingdom and other Commonwealth countries  
The rank of second lieutenant (2Lt) was introduced throughout the British Army in 1877 to replace the short-lived rank of sub-lieutenant, although it had long been used in the Royal Artillery, Royal Engineers, Fusilier and Rifle regiments. At first the rank bore no distinct insignia. In 1902, a single Bath star was introduced; the ranks of lieutenant and captain had their number of stars increased by one to (respectively) two and three. The rank is also used by the Royal Marines.

New British Army officers are normally commissioned as second lieutenants at the end of their commissioning course at RMA Sandhurst, and continue with specific training with their units. Progression to lieutenant rank usually occurs after about a year. In the British armed forces, second lieutenant is a rank which is not used as a form of address. Instead a second lieutenant named, for example, Smith is addressed and referred to as Mr Smith, with the exception that the alternative titles ensign (Foot Guards) and cornet (in the Blues and Royals and Queen's Royal Hussars) are still used. 
In the Royal Air Force, the comparable rank is pilot officer. The Royal Navy has no exact equivalent rank, and a second lieutenant is senior to a Royal Navy midshipman but junior to a sub-lieutenant.

United States 

In the United States, second lieutenant is the normal entry-level rank for most commissioned officers in the Army, Marine Corps, Air Force, and Space Force. It is equivalent to the rank of ensign in the Navy, Coast Guard, Public Health Service Commissioned Corps, and National Oceanic and Atmospheric Administration Commissioned Officer Corps.
In the Army and Marine Corps, a second lieutenant typically leads a platoon-size element (16 to 44 soldiers or marines). In the Army, until December 1917, the rank bore no insignia other than a brown sleeve braid on blouses and an officer's cap device and hat cord. In December 1917, a gold-colored bar similar to the silver-colored bar of a first lieutenant was introduced. In US military slang, the rank is sometimes called "butterbar" in reference to the insignia.

Gallery

Army

Marines

Navy

Air Force

Space Force

See also 
 British Army officer rank insignia
 Comparative military ranks
 Cornet (military rank)
 U.S. Army officer rank insignia
 Military ranks of Ukraine
 Podporuchik
 Unterleutnant
 Leutnant
 South African military ranks

References 

Military ranks of Canada
Military ranks of Australia
Pakistan Army ranks
Military ranks of the British Army
Military ranks of the Commonwealth
Military ranks of the Royal Marines
Military ranks of the United States Army
Officer ranks of the United States Air Force
Officer ranks of the United States Space Force
Military ranks of the United States Marine Corps
Military ranks of Singapore
Military ranks of the Nepali Army